The canton of Le Sancy is an administrative division of the Puy-de-Dôme department, central France. It was created at the French canton reorganisation which came into effect in March 2015. Its seat is in La Bourboule.

It consists of the following communes:
 
Avèze
Bagnols
Besse-et-Saint-Anastaise
La Bourboule
Chambon-sur-Lac
Champeix
Chastreix
Chidrac
Clémensat
Compains
Courgoul
Cros
Égliseneuve-d'Entraigues
Espinchal
Grandeyrolles
Labessette
Larodde
Ludesse
Mont-Dore
Montaigut-le-Blanc
Murat-le-Quaire
Murol
Picherande
Saint-Cirgues-sur-Couze
Saint-Diéry
Saint-Donat
Saint-Floret
Saint-Genès-Champespe
Saint-Nectaire
Saint-Pierre-Colamine
Saint-Sauves-d'Auvergne
Saint-Victor-la-Rivière
Saint-Vincent
Saurier
Singles
Solignat
Tauves
La Tour-d'Auvergne
Tourzel-Ronzières
Trémouille-Saint-Loup
Valbeleix
Verrières
Vodable

References

Cantons of Puy-de-Dôme